Bang Kapi is one of the 50 districts (khet) of Bangkok, Thailand. It is bounded by other Bangkok districts (from north clockwise): Bueng Kum, Saphan Sung, Prawet, Suan Luang, Huai Khwang, Wang Thonglang, and Lat Phrao.

Name 
The name Bang Kapi consists of two parts. Bang is a common prefix for place names in Thailand and roughly means a "hamlet by the waterfront". There are multiple theories as to the origin of kapi. The word kapi itself exists in Thai and means "shrimp paste", which is one possible origin. Another possibility is that it comes from kabi (กบิ/กบี่), a poetic word meaning "monkey", as the area used to be heavily forested and was home to many monkeys. Lastly, it could also come from kapiyoh (กะปิเยาะห์), the Thai word for a type of cap worn by Islamic men (taqiyah), owing to the fact that many Muslims settled in the area.

History
The area of Bang Kapi has a history dating back to Rama III's reign, when Chao Phraya Bodindecha (เจ้าพระยาบดินทรเดชา) led a troop to fight rebels in Champassack and Louangphabang and brought back people to settle.

As it grew into a larger town, Bang Kapi was made an amphoe (district) of Phra Nakhon province. The district was originally quite large, but has been divided since then to form new districts.

In 1966, Huay Khwang sub-district (tambon) and parts of the Bang Kapi sub-district were spun off to form Phaya Thai district.

In 1972, Phra Nakhon and Thonburi were joined as the single province, Bangkok. The title of districts and sub-districts in the capital city were changed from amphoe and tambon to khet and khwaeng, respectively. Bang Kapi became a district of the newly combined province, having at that time nine sub-districts.

In 1977, Sam Sen Nok sub-district was moved to Huai Khwang district.

In 1989, Lat Phrao district and Bueng Kum district were separated from Bang Kapi and became new districts.

On 14 October 1997, Wang Thonglang sub-district was elevated to a district, taking part of Khlong Chan sub-district with it.

Administration
The district is divided into two sub-districts (khwaeng).

District Council
The District Council for Bang Kapi has eight members, who each serve four-year terms. Elections were last held on 30 April 2006. The results were as follows:
Democrat Party - Seven seats
Thai Rak Thai Party - One seat

Places

Education
 Ramkhamhaeng University
 National Institute of Development Administration (NIDA)
 Rattana Bundit University
 Assumption University
 National Housing Authority
 Bang Kapi School
 Ramkhamhaeng Advent International School (RAIS) 
 Traill International School

Temples
Wat Bueng Thong Lang
Wat Phra Kaisri Noi
Wat Thep Leela
Wat Wat Chanthawongsaram (klang)
Wat Sri Bun Rueang

Shopping
 The Mall Ramkhamhaeng 
 The Mall Bang Kapi
 Big C Hua Mak
 Bang Kapi market
 Tesco Lotus Bang Kapi
 Kwan Riam floating market
 Ramkhamhaeng night market
 Happy Land Market 
 Homepro (Ramkhamhaeng road)
 Tawanna shopping park
 Makro Bang Kapi

Transportation
 Khlong Saen Saeb - Many piers for express boat service, including The Mall Bang Kapi. The mall Bangkapi boat pier.
 The Mall Bang Kapi bus station
 Ramkhamhaeng airport rail link station, located at Suan Luang District
 Hua Mak airport rail link station, located at Suan Luang District

Hospital
 Vejthani Hospital (private hospital)
 Ramkhamhaeng Hospital (private hospital)

Other

 Hua Mak Sports Complex (including Rajamangala Stadium)
 National Sport Museum, located at Hua Mak Sports Complex
 Prasart Museum
 Water Park Fantasia Lagoon at The Mall Bangkapi

References

External links

 BMA website with Bang Kapi landmarks

 
Districts of Bangkok